Godelieve Jansens (born 26 March 1964) is a former Belgian racing cyclist. She won the Belgian national road race title in 1992.

References

External links
 

1964 births
Living people
Belgian female cyclists
Sportspeople from Turnhout
Cyclists from Antwerp Province